Ugarci may refer to:

 Ugarci (Bosansko Grahovo), a village in Bosnia and Herzegovina
 Ugarci (Trebinje), a village in Bosnia and Herzegovina
 Ugarci, Croatia, a village in Croatia